This New Day is the fifth studio album by English rock band Embrace. It was released on 27 March 2006, being preceded by the release of the single, "Nature's Law", and went straight to number one on the UK Albums Chart. The single and album were enough to earn the band the distinction of performing "World at Your Feet", England's official 2006 FIFA World Cup song. The album was then reissued on 5 June 2006, with the song included on it. The album is also notable for being the first album ever to top the UK Album Downloads Chart.

"Nature's Law" had become the band's most successful single, having debuted at number two on the UK Singles Chart. Their second single was "World at Your Feet". The third single from the album was "Target" released on 11 September 2006, and charted at No. 29 after being number 9 in the midweek charts. The fourth single "I Can't Come Down" was released on 4 December 2006 and reached No. 54.

Notably, "Exploding Machines" was originally planned to be the title of the album.

Critical reception

This New Day received mixed reviews from music critics. At Metacritic, which assigns a normalized rating out of 100 to reviews from mainstream critics, the album received an average score of 59, based on nine reviews, indicating "mixed or average reviews".

Track listing

Release history

Charts and certifications

Weekly charts

Year-end charts

Certifications

References

External links
Official news article
Official Embrace website

2006 albums
Embrace (English band) albums
Independiente Records albums
Albums produced by Youth (musician)